You for Me is a 1952 American romantic comedy film directed by Don Weis and starring Peter Lawford, Jane Greer and Gig Young. The film was produced by Henry Berman, with music by Alberto Colombo.

Plot
Katie, a nurse, must decide whether she should marry for love or money. She is pursued by Tony, a wealthy but irresponsible sportsman, and Jeff, a handsome but conventional, doctor. Tony's ex-wife complicates matters.

Cast
 Peter Lawford as Tony Brown
 Jane Greer as Katie McDermad
 Gig Young as Dr. Jeff Chadwick
 Rita Corday as Lucille Brown
 Howard Wendell as Oliver Wherry
 Otto Hulett as Hugo McDermad
 Barbara Brown as Edna McDermad
 Barbara Ruick as Mrs. Ann Elcott
 Kathryn Card as Nurse Vogel
 Tommy Farrell as Dr. Rollie Cobb
 Elaine Stewart as Girl in Club Car Knitting
 Perry Sheehan as Nurse
 Paul Smith as Frank Elcott
 Helen Winston as Flora Adams
 Ned Glass as Harlow Douglas (uncredited)
 Hal Smith as Malcolm (uncredited)

Reception

Box office
According to MGM records, the film earned $457,000 in the U.S. and Canada and $123,000 elsewhere, resulting in a loss of $38,000.

Critical response
Picturegoer magazine wrote: "Jane Greer puts over the venerable story so cleverly and makes such good use of the smart dialogue that it ... generously hands out laughs."

References

External links
 
 
 
 

1952 films
1952 romantic comedy films
American romantic comedy films
American black-and-white films
1950s English-language films
Metro-Goldwyn-Mayer films
Films with screenplays by William Roberts (screenwriter)
Films about nurses
1950s American films